"Bearskin" is a fairy tale collected by the Brothers Grimm (KHM 101). A variant from Sicily, "Don Giovanni de la Fortuna", was collected by Laura Gonzenbach in Sicilianische Märchen and included by Andrew Lang in The Pink Fairy Book. Italo Calvino included another Italian version, "The Devil's Breeches" from Bologna, in his Italian Folktales.

The tale is classified as Aarne–Thompson type 361 (Bearskin), in which a man gains a fortune and a beautiful bride by entering into a pact with the devil.

Origin 
The modern version of tale was originally published by the Brothers Grimm in the first edition of Kinder- und Hausmärchen vol. 2 (1815) no. 15, under the title "Der Teufel Grünrock" (English: 'Devil Greenjacket'), and substantially revised in the 5th edition of the book. Their story is based on the version collected by the von Haxthausen family, and on the tale "Vom Ursprung des Namens Bärnhäuter", first published in 1670 by Hans Jakob Christoffel von Grimmelshausen.

Synopsis
A man served as a soldier, but when war ended, his parents had died, and his brothers had no place for him.

A green-coated man with a cloven hoof appeared to him and  offered to make him rich if he would for seven years not cut his hair, clip his nails, bathe, or pray; and wear a coat and cloak that he would give him. At the end, if he survived, he would be rich and free. If he died during the time, the devil would have him. The desperate soldier agreed, and the devil gave him the green coat - telling him he would find its pockets always full of limitless money - and then a bearskin, telling him that he must sleep in it and would be known as "Bearskin" because of it.

Bearskin set out, and gave much money to the poor that they would pray for him to live out the seven years. After several years, he grew so revolting that he had to pay heavily to get any shelter. In the fourth year, he heard an old man lamenting and persuaded him to tell his tale: the old man had lost all his money, did not know how to provide for his daughters and could not pay the innkeeper, so he would be sent to jail. Bearskin paid the innkeeper and gave the old man a purse of gold as well.

The old man said that he would marry him to one of his daughters in gratitude. The oldest daughter ran away, screaming, from the sight. The middle one said he was worse than a bear that had tried to pass itself off as human. The  youngest one agreed to fulfill her father's promise. Bearskin gave her half a ring and promised to return in three years. Her sisters ridiculed her at length.

At the end of the seven years Bearskin found the devil again and demanded he fulfill his promise. The devil then proceeded to bathe Bearskin, clip his nails and cut his hair until he was as good as new. Bearskin then demanded that the devil say the  Lord's prayer. The devil warned Bearskin not to push his luck, as he has already won their bargain, and disappeared. Clean and with his money, Bearskin dressed himself as a fine gentleman and went to the old man's house, where the older sisters served him, and his bride (dressed in black) showed no reaction to him. He told the old man that he would marry one of his daughters. The two older sisters ran off to dress splendidly, and Bearskin dropped his half of the ring into a wine cup and gave it to his bride. She drank it and realized that he was her bridegroom.

They married. Upon realizing who Bearskin was and what they had given up, one sister hanged herself in rage and the other drowned herself. That night, the devil knocked on the door to tell Bearskin that he had gotten two souls for the price of one.

Variants
The story is similar to other AT-361 tales like the Swiss "The Devil as Partner", the Austrian "Hell's Gatekeeper", the Russian "Never-Wash", the Sicilian "Don Giovanni de la Fortuna", or the Philippine "The Reward of Kindness".

In "Don Giovanni de la Fortuna", Don Giovanni is not a soldier; he squandered the fortune his father left him and met the devil while begging. The time limit is three years, three months, and three days, and in that time, he buys a house and his fame spreads; the king asks him to lend him money, and that is how the promise to marry is brought about. The sisters, though they die, are not explicitly taken by the devil.

The "Devil's Breeches" is close to "Don Giovanni de la Fortuna", but while the hero also squanders his money, he attempts to support himself by working as a servant, an attempt that fails because all his masters' wives or sisters fall in love with him, and he has to leave every job. Calvino notes that in his sources, the sisters were merely envious, and added their explicit wish that they would gladly be taken by the Devil because of their rage.

"Hell's Gatekeeper" is another version of Bearskin that is more brief than the other versions. In Hell's Gatekeeper, the main character is not a soldier, but a child who has been dirty for the entirety of his life. This causes the boy to be sent to hell and serve as the gatekeeper of hell for seven years after which he is released. The boy vows to stay clean forever after the experience to avoid being sent to hell eternal.

Yet another version of Bearskin is "The Reward of Kindness" a story about a couple who can not have a child, so the wife promises her child to serve the devil if she could only have one. The wife then has a child and a devil takes him away and tries to tempt him into his service. The child refuses to work for the devil and eventually, the devil give up and allows the child to leave his service for good if he takes a large bag of money and only does good with it in seven years. The child does good in the seven years and returns to the devil and is then freed from the devil's service and lives a happy life.

Analysis
The tale has much in common with Beauty and the Beast and other tales of monstrous bridegrooms (or brides), but unlike most the main character is the transformed bridegroom.  Some other tales, such as Hans My Hedgehog have such a main character, but differ in that, in Bearskin, the wedding is not the trigger for his being restored to human form.

The hero of the German version is a soldier.  The tale was collected at a time at which many German kings were conscripting many more men into their armies, and the people of the country and town, who were forced to pay taxes to support such new armies and to house them.  Soldiers often left, whether by any discharge they could get, or by deserting, and such an ex-soldier often had to make his way in the world like the hero of Bearskin.

In popular culture
 Tom Davenport produced an Americanized version of the story for the From the Brothers Grimm series. The story is set in rural Virginia after the Civil War with the protagonist being a desperate ex-Confederate soldier. The only changes made to the story are the crying man is a farmer who has lost all of his money and will lose his farm, and the Devil tells the audience, not Bearskin, that he gets two souls for the price of one. The tale is often considered the most chilling of the series.
 A Russian story version was written by Boris Shergin, called "Pron'ka the Dirty", later adapted into a cartoon called Mister Pron'ka. There, the devil is replaced with a bored wealthy American who makes a bet with a Russian named Pron'ka, with the time limit of 15 years. In return for the standard limitations, Pron'ka is given wares to start a large scale business in Russia. The American, in the meantime, is publishing scientific works and articles about the experiment. By the end of the term, the Tsar himself is heavily in debt, and gives one of his daughters to Pron'ka in order to secure another loan. The American, upon returning to his homeland afterwards, is criticized for wasting all the time and money, but the criticism ends once the others learn that the Tsar's other two daughters, horrified at the prospect of having Pron'ka as a brother-in-law, eloped with the American's brothers; a fact of great national pride.
 A version of "Bearskin" appears in the Japanese animated series Grimm's Masterpiece Theater (known as Grimm's Fairy Tale Classics overseas). In this version, the soldier is named Johann. His fiancé's sisters are clearly upset when they find out what they lost, but they do not actually kill themselves and the Devil (here a "minor demon") does not get anything.
 Bearskin is a character in Bill Willingham's Fables series.
 American composer Stephen DeCesare composed a musical based on the fairy tale: Bearskin: (the musical).

Operas
Operas based on the tale were composed by Siegfried Wagner (op. 1, 1899) and by Arnold Mendelssohn (op.11, 1900).

See also

 The Dragon and his Grandmother
 The Small-tooth Dog
 The Daughter of the Skies

References

External links

 
 SurLaLune's Annotated Bearskin including variants, modern interpretations and illustrations
 Bearskin

Grimms' Fairy Tales
Fictional soldiers
German fairy tales
Fiction about suicide
The Devil in fairy tales
Deal with the Devil
Stories within Italian Folktales
ATU 300-399
Laura Gonzenbach